Club Majesty is the fourth studio album by Swedish rock band, Royal Republic. The album was released on 31 May 2019 through Nuclear Blast in the U.S. and European Union outside of Germany and Arising Empire in Germany.

Stylistically, the album has been described as a radical departure from the band's previous releases, which fused hard rock, garage rock, and blues rock. Club Majesty has been described by music critics has a hybrid of disco, new wave, and dance punk. The album has been met with positive reviews from contemporary music critics. "Stop Movin'" was featured on the game Just Dance 2020.

Track listing

Charts

References

External links 
 

2019 albums
Royal Republic albums